Chickering Hall (est.1883) was a concert auditorium in Boston, Massachusetts, in the late 19th century. It occupied the second floor of Chickering and Sons showrooms on Tremont Street, near the corner of West Street. "Bradlee, Winslow and Wetherell were the architects, and Mr. E.P. Treadwell, the decorator. The hall [was] lighted by the Edison electric light." By 1895: "Tremont St., towards Boylston, for some years has been called Piano Row, for a long row of piano agencies occupied a good portion of the block; but of late most of these have migrated to Boylston St. Chickering Hall, at 152 Tremont St., was for many years a favorite place for fashionable musicales, and the headquarters of the musical profession."

Performances/Events

1880s
 Matthew Arnold
 George Washington Cable
 Hubert von Herkomer
 Kneisel Quartet

1890s
 Prof. Carpenter, hypnotist
 Vladimir de Pachmann
 James A. Herne's "Margaret Fleming"
 Thomas Nelson Page
 F. Hopkinson Smith
 Edward Alexander MacDowell
 George Grossmith, comedian

Images

See also
 Chickering and Sons
 Chickering Hall, Boston (1901), Huntington Avenue

References

Music venues completed in 1883
Former buildings and structures in Boston
Cultural history of Boston
Event venues established in 1883
Former theatres in Boston
Boston Theater District